"Major" is a song by American rapper Young Dolph, released on August 31, 2018 as the lead single from his fourth studio album Role Model (2018). It features American rapper Key Glock and was produced by BandPlay and Drew Taylor.

Background
In an interview with HotNewHipHop, BandPlay revealed that the song was originally a solo for Key Glock. Both Young Dolph and Glock had recorded a song to a same beat, so BandPlay brought them together.

Composition
The song sees Young Dolph rapping in a flow imitating that of "Rover" by BlocBoy JB about rising from poverty to becoming a wealthy and successful rapper, while Key Glock raps about representing his record label Paper Route Empire in his verse.

Charts

Certifications

References

2018 singles
2018 songs
Young Dolph songs
Key Glock songs